Esmeralda Ribeiro (born 1958) is a Brazilian journalist and writer of African descent.

She was born in São Paulo and studied journalism at the University of São Paulo. Ribeiro became a member of Quilombhoje, an Afro-Brazilian literary group, in 1982. Her first poems appeared in the 1982 anthology Cadernos negros (Black notebooks); her first short story "Ogun" appeared in the 1985 anthology. She later worked with Marcio Barbosa as editor for Cadernos negros. Her work was translated into English for the collections Moving Beyond Boundaries, International Dimension of Black Women's Writing and Enfim...Nos/Finally...Us: Escritoras Negras Brasileiras Contemporaneas/Contemporary Black Brazilian Women Writers, both published in 1995.

In 1988, she published a short novel Malungos e milongas.

Ribeiro has also worked for the São Paulo state Secretary of Culture.

References

External links 
 

1959 births
Living people
Afro-Brazilian people
20th-century Brazilian poets
Brazilian women short story writers
20th-century Brazilian short story writers
Brazilian women journalists
Brazilian women novelists
20th-century Brazilian novelists
21st-century Brazilian women writers
21st-century Brazilian writers
University of São Paulo alumni
Writers from São Paulo
Brazilian women poets